Ivano Lussignoli (23 July 1972 – 20 September 2003) was an Italian sprint canoer who competed in the late 1990s. He won a silver medal in the K-4 200 m event at the 1998 ICF Canoe Sprint World Championships in Szeged.

Lussignoli competed in the K-4 1000 m event at the 1996 Summer Olympics in Atlanta, but was eliminated in the semifinals.

References

Sports-reference.com profile

1972 births
2003 deaths
Canoeists at the 1996 Summer Olympics
Italian male canoeists
Olympic canoeists of Italy
ICF Canoe Sprint World Championships medalists in kayak
20th-century Italian people